This is a list of all managers of Reading Football Club.

Managerial history 
 Managers in italics were hired as caretakers.

References

Managers
 
Reading